The Battle of the Mincio River may refer to two battles on the Mincio River in northern Italy, both between a French army and an Austrian army commanded by Heinrich Graf von Bellegarde during the Napoleonic Wars:

Battle of the Mincio River (1800) (also known as the Battle of Pozzolo), which occurred during the War of the Second Coalition
Battle of the Mincio River (1814), which occurred during the War of the Sixth Coalition